The 2020 season is Yangon United's 11th season in the Myanmar National League since 2009.

Season Review

Current squad

Transfer

Transfer In

Transfer Out

Coaching staff

|}

Other information

|-

References

Yangon United